The 1958–59 season was the club's 40th official season and their 56th year in existence. The club participated in the final season of the İstanbul Football League finishing in 5th place, behind Fenerbahçe, Galatasaray, Karagümrük and İstanbulspor. By finishing in the top 8, the team qualified for the inaugural season of the new national league; Turkish First Football League. By winning the Turkish Federation Cup a season ago Beşiktaş qualified for the European Cup, but lost to Real Madrid 1-3 on aggregate (0-2 away, 1-1 home) in the first round. Real Madrid however would go on to win the cup for a 4th time. Beşiktaş was placed into the "White Group" along with Fenerbahçe, Altay, Izmirspor, Ankaragücü, Hacettepe, Beykoz and İstanbulspor. Beşiktaş finished 2nd place behind Fenerbahçe missing the final match, where Fenerbahçe would beat Galatasaray for the title.

İstanbul Football League

Beşiktaş played in the final season of the İstanbul Football League. They finished 5th.

Turkish First Football League

In the first season of the Turkish First Football League (now Turkish Super League), Beşiktaş finished 2nd behind Fenerbahçe, thereby failing to qualify for the final.

White Group

Season

European Cup
Beşiktaş became the first Turkish team to qualify for the European Cup. They qualified in 1957 but the Turkish Football Federation didn't send their name for the draw, therefore being disqualified.
They beat Olympiacos F.C. in the preliminary round by a w/o because Olympiacos withdrew from the competition. In the first round they played the defending champions Real Madrid. In the first leg Beşiktaş lost 0-2 and in the second leg they tied 1-1. Real Madrid won 3-1 on the aggregate.

Preliminary round

First round

Beşiktaş lost 1-3 on aggregate.

References

External links
Turkish Soccer

Beşiktaş J.K. seasons
Besiktas